Edmond Hoxha (born 16 May 1997) is an Albanian football player. He was most recently playing as a forward for KF Besa Kavajë football club in Albania's First Division.

References

1997 births
Living people
Footballers from Kavajë
Albanian footballers
Association football defenders
Besa Kavajë players
Besëlidhja Lezhë players
Kategoria e Parë players